Visitors to Guinea-Bissau must obtain a visa on arrival (available to all nationalities and also online in a form of pre-enrolment or at one of the Guinea-Bissau diplomatic missions) unless they come from one of the countries or territories that are visa exempt.

Visa policy map

Visa exemption 

Visa-free
Citizens of the following 14 countries and territories can visit Guinea-Bissau without a visa:

Holders of diplomatic or service passports issued to nationals of Community of Portuguese Language Countries: Angola, Brazil, Cabo Verde, Mozambique, Portugal, Sao Tome and Principe do not require a visa.

 Visa on arrival
Holders of passports issued by all countries can obtain a visa on arrival for a maximum stay of 90 days.

See also

 Visa requirements for Guinea-Bissauan citizens

References 

Guinea-Bissau
Foreign relations of Guinea-Bissau